The  was a bombing target ship class of the Imperial Japanese Navy (IJN), serving during World War II. 5 vessels were planned under the Kai-Maru 5 Programme (Ship #5411–5415), however, only the lead ship Ōhama was completed.

Design and Construction
Project number J36. In 1941, the IJN had decided to build the bombing target ship , with a speed under . However, what the IJN required was target ship which could emulate the higher speed of the s and s. The class specification given was therefore 33 knots, use of a destroyer hull, equipped with the  machinery, enabled this to be achieved and able to withstand a 10 kilogram bomb dropped from  meters. Her armament consisted initially of only four anti-aircraft machine guns,. However, the significant loss of destroyers between 1942 and 1944 together with delays in mass production of the Kaibōkan-escort ships caused Ōhama to be converted. Thus rearmed for this escort role with many anti-aircraft arms and anti-submarine weapons, the lead ship Ōhama was completed on the 10th of January 1945.

Service
Ōhama was assigned to the Combined Fleet on 10 January 1945. However, she did not take up any target ship duties, due to the significant losses resulting from the Battle of the Philippine Sea and Battle of Leyte Gulf. Rather she was deployed to convoy escort duties in the Yokosuka area. In August 1945, she was dispatched to Onagawa Local Defense Squadron and on 9 August 1945 sunk by carrier aircraft. The second ship laid down, Ōsashi was discontinued in 1945. Whilst three other class vessels were cancelled in 1944.

Ships in class

Footnotes

Bibliography
 Ships of the World No.522, Auxiliary Vessels of the Imperial Japanese Navy, (Japan), March 1997
 The Maru Special, Japanese Naval Vessels No.34 Japanese auxiliary vessels, Ushio Shobō (Japan), December 1979
 The Maru Special, Japanese Naval Vessels No.38 Japanese aircraft carriers II, Ushio Shobō (Japan), March 1980
 Senshi Sōsho Vol.88, Naval armaments and war preparation (2), "And after the outbreak of war", Asagumo Simbun (Japan), October 1975
  (SNAJ), Histories of shipbuilding in Shōwa period (1),  (Japan), September 1977
 Shizuo Fukui, FUKUI SHIZUO COLLECTION "Japanese Naval Vessels 1869–1945", KK Bestsellers (Japan), December 1994

World War II naval ships of Japan